Mullach Clach a' Bhlàir or Meall Tional is a Munro in the Cairngorm mountain range of Scotland.

Sources

Munros
Mountains and hills of the Cairngorms
One-thousanders of Scotland